Quegobla is a civil parish of Baradine County, New South Wales.

It is located in Narrabri Shire at 30°29′54″S 148°54′04″E and is within the Pilliga National Park.

References

Localities in New South Wales
Geography of New South Wales